Preben Jensen (canoeist)
 Preben Jensen (footballer)